Serena Evans (born 2 December 1959 in London, England) is a British actress who is best known for playing Police Sergeant Patricia Dawkins in the sitcom The Thin Blue Line which was shown on BBC1 from 1995 to 1996.

She also had a regular role as Sarah Chapman in ITV sitcom The Piglet Files, and appeared in six episodes of The Comic Strip Presents playing various characters, such as the schoolgirl, in  'The Bad News Tour'.

Evans is the daughter of actors Tenniel Evans and Evangeline Banks, and is granddaughter of actor/director/producer Leslie Banks on her mother's side; her brother Matthew Evans is a TV director. On her father's side she is a direct descendant of Isaac Evans, brother of Mary Ann Evans otherwise known as author George Eliot. She is married to the actor Daniel Flynn and they have two children together.

In 2010, Evans appeared in the role of Mistress Page in The Merry Wives of Windsor at Shakespeare's Globe Theatre in London.

Between 2018 and 2021, she starred in the horror drama, Approaching Shadows; the film premiered at the BFI Southbank in London on 3 December 2021, had a private VIP screening at Vue Rhyl on 21 March 2022, and released digitally on 1 July 2022, through many platforms such as iTunes, Sky Store, Microsoft, YouTube, Google Play and Amazon Prime Video.

Notes

External links 

1959 births
Living people
British television actresses
21st-century English actresses
20th-century English actresses
Actresses from London